Amblyseius utriculus is a species of mite in the family Phytoseiidae.

References

utriculus
Articles created by Qbugbot
Animals described in 1989
Taxa named by Wolfgang Karg